X Athena Widgets or Xaw is a GUI widget library for the X Window System. Developed as part of Project Athena, Xaw was written under the auspices of the MIT X Consortium as a sample widget set built on X Toolkit Intrinsics (Xt); Xt and Xaw are collectively known as the X Toolkit.  Xaw has been largely superseded by more sophisticated toolkits like Motif, and later toolkits such as GTK, and Qt, but it is still maintained (by the X.Org Foundation) and is available as part of most X Window System installations. The library, like other core parts of X, is licensed under the MIT License.

In a talk for USENIX, X pioneer Jim Gettys remarked that although Athena widgets were "ugly", they were often used in the period of X history that he describes as the "GUI wars", as a safe alternative to the competing Motif and Open Look toolkits.

References

External links 
 Xaw library 1.0.7 source code, X.Org Foundation website
 Survey of Widget Sets - comparisons of various Xaw versions.
 Book — X Toolkit Intrinsics Ref Man R5, Third Edition.
 X11 Programming and the Athena Widget Set  (an Xaw programming tutorial), GNU/Linux Fanatics Group

Massachusetts Institute of Technology software
X-based libraries
Widget toolkits